Deh-e Bala (also Romanized as Deh-eh Bālā and Dehbālā) is a village in Siriz Rural District, Yazdanabad District, Zarand County, Kerman Province, Iran. At the 2006 census, its population was 209, in 51 families.

References 

Populated places in Zarand County